H8, H08 or H-8 may stand for:
 H-8 bomber, a 1970s Chinese military aircraft
 H8 Family, a 1990s large family of 8-bit and 16-bit microcontrollers made by Hitachi (Renesas Technology)
 H08 microcontroller from Hycon Technology
 H-8 (film), a 1958 Yugoslav movie
  H-8, a sector in Islamabad, Pakistan
 H8 Standing Way, a road in Milton Keynes grid road system
 British NVC community H8, a type of heath community in the British National Vegetation Classification
 Hagström H8, the world's first massproduced eight stringed bass guitar.
 Haval H8, a Chinese mid-size SUV
 Highway H08 (Ukraine), a road in Ukraine
 Heathkit H-8, a 1977 home computer kit
 HMS H8, a 1915 British Royal Navy H class submarine 
 HMS Eclipse (H08), a 1934 E class destroyer of the Royal Navy
 PRR H8, an American 2-8-0 steam locomotives model
 C&O H-8 "Allegheny" steam locomotive, of the Whyte notation 2-6-6-6
 USS H-8 (SS-151), a 1918 United States Navy submarine
 H8, flat-eight engine

H8 may also represent:
 The airline code for Dalavia airline
 the internet slang for "hate"
 a robot villain in Magnus, Robot Fighter -  the chief of police for North Am, he lived up to his name, as he really hated humans
 a supercomputer used by NASA
 Halloween 8, a horror film abbreviated to H8
 California Proposition 8 (2008)

See also
8H (disambiguation)